Georgius Chrysococcas (also Chrysococca; Georgios Chrysokokkas, fl. 1340s) was a  Greek physician, geographer and astronomer. 
He left a commentary astronomical system of medieval Persia, known as Syntaxis ton Person (Persian Compendium) recording a number of  Perso-Arabic star and constellation names of c. the 11th century.
This text circulated in late Byzantine-era astronomy and was also received in European astronomy in the 15th century. 
A partial Latin translation of the work is extant in manuscript form under the title Expositio In Syntaxin Persarum, in copies of the 15th and 16th century, one of these in the hand of Joseph Justus Scaliger.

References

John Hudson; Henry Dodwell (eds.), Geographiae veteris scriptores graeci minores, Oxford 1698-1717.

14th-century Greek astronomers
14th-century deaths
14th-century Greek physicians
14th-century geographers